Lord Wellington was launched in 1810 at Hull, England. She made 20 voyages to Davis Strait and Greenland as a northern whale fishery  whaler. She was lost in June 1834 on her 21st voyage.

Career
Lord Wellington first appeared in Lloyd's Register (LR) in June 1810 with H. Rose, master, and [ W.] Bolton, owner. Her trade was Hull–Davis Strait.

The following data is from Coltish:

The following data is from Lloyd's Register:

The following data is from Coltish:

The Register of Shipping (RS) for 1833 showed Lord Wellington with Harrison, master, Shackells, owner, and trade Hull–Greenland. She had had damages repaired in 1827 and 1832, and a thorough repair in 1832.

Fate
Lord Wellington was lost on 15 June 1834 in Melville Bay, Greenland. Her crew were rescued.

Notes

Citations

References
 
 

1810 ships
Age of Sail merchant ships of England
Whaling ships
Maritime incidents in June 1834